Tyson Bull (born 21 May 1993) is an Australian artistic gymnast. He competed at both the 2018 World Artistic Gymnastics Championships and 2019 World Artistic Gymnastics Championships.

Career 

He won the silver medal in the rings at the 2011 Commonwealth Youth Games held on the Isle of Man.

In 2018, he competed in the horizontal bar event at the World Artistic Gymnastics Championships held in Doha, Qatar; he did not qualify to compete in the final.

In 2019, he qualified to represent Australia at the 2020 Summer Olympics in Tokyo, Japan after finishing in 7th place in the horizontal bar event at the 2019 World Artistic Gymnastics Championships held in Stuttgart, Germany.

Bull qualified for the Tokyo 2020 Olympics. He competed on the horizontal bar and qualified for the final. In the final his total of 12.566 was just off the pace and he finished fifth. Bull also competed on the parallel bars but failed to make the cut. Full details.

At the 2022 Commonwealth Games, Bull won the silver medal in the Horizontal bar.

Competition results

References

External links 
 

Living people
1993 births
Sportspeople from Melbourne
Australian male artistic gymnasts
Gymnasts at the 2020 Summer Olympics
Olympic gymnasts of Australia
Commonwealth Games silver medallists for Australia
Commonwealth Games medallists in gymnastics
Gymnasts at the 2022 Commonwealth Games
21st-century Australian people
Medallists at the 2022 Commonwealth Games